Velika is a village in the municipality of Plav, Montenegro, close to the village of Murino.

History 
In 1479, the Ottomans annexed Gornje Polimlje and Velika. Subsequently, these villages were organized into the Sanjak of Scutari.It was the site of several conflicts during the battles for Plav and Gusinje, between the Albanians under Prizren League and Montenegrin forces in 1879–80.

During WWII, when the region was annexed by Axis forces, 428 Serbs and Montenegrins from the village were killed by the ethnic, nazi Albanian SS Skandenberg division on July 28, 1944.

Demographics
According to the 2011 census, its population was 308.

References

External links

Populated places in Plav Municipality
Serb communities in Montenegro